John Bunyan Keyworth (9 May 1859 – 24 April 1954) was a British archer who competed at the 1908 Summer Olympics in London. He was born in Lincoln, Lincolnshire. Keyworth entered the double York round event in 1908, taking ninth place with 622 points. He also competed in the Continental style event, placing twelfth at 190 points.

References

External links
 profile
 
 

1859 births
1954 deaths
Sportspeople from Lincoln, England
British male archers
Olympic archers of Great Britain
Archers at the 1908 Summer Olympics
20th-century British people